The High Commission of Papua New Guinea in London is the diplomatic mission of Papua New Guinea in the United Kingdom. In line with other Papuan diplomatic missions it is also referred to as Kundu London, after the traditional Papuan kundu drum. The High Commission was established in 1975, the year of Papua New Guinea's independence from Australia.

Gallery

References

External links

Official site

Papua New Guinea
Diplomatic missions of Papua New Guinea
Papua New Guinea–United Kingdom relations
Buildings and structures in the City of Westminster
St James's